Huguette Delavault (15 January 1924 – 2 April 2003) was a French mathematician, specializing in mathematical physics.

Education and career
Delavault was born on 15 January 1924, in Andilly, Charente-Maritime; her parents were both teachers. She studied at a school for teachers, the École normale d'instituteurs in La Rochelle, France, from 1940 to 1943, and then became a student at the École normale supérieure de Fontenay-aux-Roses from 1946 to 1949. After interrupting her studies for health reasons, in 1952 she passed her agrégation in mathematics. She became a researcher at CNRS from 1952 to 1958, while earning a doctorate in mathematics in 1957 from the University of Paris under the supervision of Henri Villat; her dissertation applied the Laplace transform and Hankel transform to the heat equation and Maxwell's equations, using cylindrical coordinates. She became a researcher at the University of Rennes in 1958, was promoted to professor in 1962, and remained there until 1970, when she became a professor at the École nationale supérieure d'ingénieurs de Caen. She retired in 1984.

Delavault died on 2 April 2003.

Activism and service
From 1976 onward Delavault was a prominent activist for feminist causes, including popularizing science and mathematics among women and providing equal opportunities for them both in the academy and in the public sector.
She served as deputy director of the École normale supérieure de Fontenay-aux-Roses from 1976 to 1980, and was twice president of l'Association française des femmes diplômées des universités (the French association for university women).

Awards and honors
Delavault became an officer in the Order of Academic Palms in 1967. In 1971 she became a chevalier (knight) in the French National Order of Merit, and in 1995 a chevalier in the Legion of Honour.

References

1924 births
2003 deaths
Chevaliers of the Légion d'honneur
Knights of the Ordre national du Mérite
20th-century French mathematicians
French women mathematicians
20th-century French women scientists
20th-century women mathematicians